The Schrattenfluh (also spelled Schrattenflue) is a mountain of the Swiss Alps, located in the upper Emmental, in the canton of Lucerne. The Schrattenfluh is composed of several summits of which the highest is named Hengst.

Pictures

References

External links

 Schrattenfluh on Hikr

Mountains of the Alps
Mountains of Switzerland
Mountains of the canton of Lucerne
Two-thousanders of Switzerland